Louis Carl Johanson (January 4, 1929 – March 10, 2004) was an American politician from Pennsylvania who served as a Democratic member of the Pennsylvania State Senate for the 3rd district from 1965 to 1966.  He served as a member of the Philadelphia City Council from 1968 to 1981.  He was convicted for bribery and conspiracy during the Abscam sting operation and served three years in prison.

Early life
Johanson was born in Philadelphia, Pennsylvania

Biography
As a member of the Philadelphia City Council, he was implicated in the Abscam sting operation and was convicted for taking a bribe from FBI agents posing as representatives of an Arab sheik. He was defended by John J. Duffy, Jr.  He was convicted of bribery and conspiracy and sentenced to three years in prison and fined $20,000.

Johanson later moved to a home in Longport, New Jersey.

References

1929 births
2004 deaths
Abscam
Philadelphia City Council members
Democratic Party Pennsylvania state senators
Politicians convicted under the Travel Act
Politicians convicted of conspiracy to defraud the United States
People from Longport, New Jersey
Pennsylvania politicians convicted of corruption
Pennsylvania politicians convicted of crimes
20th-century American politicians